The Movement for United Albania is an irredentist and nationalist political movement in Albania.

History 
On July 16, 2016 the Movement for United Albania held its official founding Convention. The Movement for United Albania's political foundations are based on the irredentist concept of Greater Albania and its aim is to unite Albania and foreign territories from neighboring countries such as Kosovo, Republic of Macedonia, Serbia, Montenegro, and Greece into a greater Albanian national state, or "United Albania".

The president and the founder of LSHB is Kastriot Berishaj, who was arrested on 6 June 2017, alongside Alban Mulaj and Burim Veliu, by the Albanian police on the grounds of burning foreign flags, igniting national hatred, distribution of unconstitutional printed material, and creation of unconstitutional parties & associations.

On 11 July 2017, the Movement for United Albania was legalized by the Republic of Albania, according to decision no. 5620 of the Court of Tirana Judicial Council, according to the constitution of the Republic of Albania, which recognizes the right to national unification as a legitimate and constitutional right.

References

External links
Official website of the Movement for United Albania
Official website of Tahir Veliu

Albanian nationalist parties
Political movements in Albania